A machete is a broad blade used either as an  agricultural implement similar  to an axe, or in combat like a long-bladed knife. In the Spanish language, the word is possibly a diminutive form of the word macho, which was used to refer to sledgehammers. Alternatively, its origin may be machaera, the name given by the Romans to the falcata. It is the origin of the English language  equivalent term matchet, though this is less commonly used. In much of the English-speaking Caribbean, such as Jamaica, Barbados, Guyana, Grenada, and Trinidad and Tobago, the term cutlass is used for these agricultural tools.

Uses

Agriculture
In various tropical and subtropical countries, the machete is frequently used to cut through rainforest undergrowth and for agricultural purposes (e.g. cutting sugar cane). Besides this, in Latin America a common use is for such household tasks as cutting large foodstuffs into pieces—much as a cleaver is used—or to perform crude cutting tasks, such as making simple wooden handles for other tools. It is common to see people using machetes for other jobs, such as splitting open coconuts, yard work, removing small branches and plants, chopping animals' food, and clearing bushes. Matchetes are made from hot forging process and with Carbon steel

Machetes are often considered tools and used by adults. However, many hunter–gatherer societies and cultures surviving through subsistence agriculture begin teaching babies to use sharp tools, including machetes, before their first birthdays.

Warfare 

People in uprisings sometimes use these weapons. For example, the Boricua Popular Army are unofficially called macheteros because of the machete-wielding laborers of sugar cane fields of past Puerto Rico.

Many of the killings in the 1994 Rwandan genocide were performed with machetes, and they were the primary weapon used by the Interahamwe militias there. Machetes were also a distinctive tool and weapon of the Haitian Tonton Macoute.

In 1762, the British captured Havana in a lengthy siege during the Seven Years' War. Volunteer militiamen led by Pepe Antonio, a Guanabacoa councilman, were issued with machetes during the unsuccessful defense of the city. The machete was also the most iconic weapon during the independence wars in Cuba, although it saw limited battlefield use. Carlos Manuel de Céspedes, owner of the sugar refinery La Demajagua near Manzanillo, freed his slaves on 10 October 1868. He proceeded to lead them, armed with machetes, in revolt against the Spanish government. The first cavalry charge using machetes as the primary weapon was carried out on 4 November 1868 by Máximo Gómez, a sergeant born in the Dominican Republic, who later became the general in chief of the Cuban Army.

The machete is a common side arm and tool for many ethnic groups in West Africa. Machetes in this role are referenced in Chinua Achebe's Things Fall Apart.

Some countries have a name for the blow of a machete; the Spanish machetazo is sometimes used in English. In the British Virgin Islands, Grenada, Jamaica, Saint Kitts and Nevis, Barbados, Saint Lucia, and Trinidad and Tobago, the word planass means to hit someone with the flat of the blade of a machete or cutlass. To strike with the sharpened edge is to "chop". Throughout the Caribbean, the term 'cutlass' refers to a laborers' cutting tool.

The Brazilian Army's Instruction Center on Jungle Warfare developed a machete-style knife with a blade  in length and a very pronounced clip point. This machete is issued with a  Bowie knife and a sharpening stone in the scabbard; collectively called a "jungle kit" (Conjunto de Selva in Portuguese); it is manufactured by Indústria de Material Bélico do Brasil (IMBEL).

The machete was used as a weapon during the Mau Mau rebellion, in the Rwandan Genocide, and in South Africa, particularly in the 1980s and early 1990s when the former province of Natal was wracked by conflict between the African National Congress and the Zulu-nationalist Inkatha Freedom Party.

Manufacture 

Good machetes rely on the materials used and the shape. In the past, the most famous manufacturer of machetes in Latin America and the Spanish-speaking Caribbean was Collins Company of Collinsville, Connecticut. The company was founded as Collins & Company in 1826 by Samuel W. Collins to make axes. Its first machetes were sold in 1845 and became so famous that all good machetes were called "un Collins". In the English-speaking Caribbean, Robert Mole & Sons of Birmingham, England, was long considered the manufacturer of agricultural cutlasses of the best quality. Some Robert Mole blades survive as souvenirs of travelers to Trinidad, Jamaica, and, less commonly, St. Lucia.

Colombia is the largest exporter of machetes worldwide.

Cultural influence 

The flag of Angola features a machete, along with a cog-wheel.

The southern Brazilian state of Rio Grande do Sul has a dance called the dança dos facões (machetes' dance) in which the dancers, who are usually men, bang their machetes against various surfaces while dancing, simulating a battle. Maculelê, an Afro-Brazilian dance and martial art, can also be performed with facões. This practice began in the city of Santo Amaro, Bahia, in the northeastern part of the country.

In the Philippines, the bolo is used in training in eskrima, the indigenous martial art of the Philippines.

Similar tools 
The panga or tapanga is a variant used in East and Southern Africa. This name may be of Swahili etymology; not to be confused with the Panga fish. The upper inclined portion of the blade may be sharpened.

Other similar tools include the parang and the golok (from Malaysia and Indonesia); however, these tend to have shorter, thicker blades with a primary grind, and are more effective on woody vegetation.

The tsakat is a similar tool used in Armenia for clearing land of vegetation.

Other similar tools include:
 Dusack
 Golok
 Kopis
 Kukri
 Macuahuitl
 Seax
 Sorocaban Knife

Popular culture
 Marvel Comics features machetes used by Kraven the Hunter; and also Harley Clinvendon, his counterpart in the 1967 version of Spider-Man.
 In the Friday the 13th franchise, a machete is Jason Voorhees' signature weapon. 
 In the 1999 version of Tarzan, a machete was used by Clayton, a poacher.
 Sokka, one of the main characters in Avatar: The Last Airbender, uses a machete.
 Teenage Mutant Ninja Turtles features a machete used by Rocksteady, a mutant rhinoceros thug.
 Machetes were among many weapons used by Sideshow Bob in The Simpsons.
 Machetes were the primary weapons for Isador "Machete" Cortez in the Spy Kids films, the Grindhouse fake trailer, Machete and Machete Kills.
 The Last Circus features the Funny Clown, father of the protagonist Javier, who wields a machete.
 The machete is the short-range weapon of the Medellín Cartel when fighting Somali pirates in Deadliest Warrior.
 The Hunger Games: Catching Fire features a machete becoming the primary weapon for Peeta Mellark.
 James Bond film series features machetes in Live and Let Die, Licence to Kill, and the 2006 version of Casino Royale. 
 Mother Russia wields a machete with the words "God give, God take" inscribed on the blade in Russian on Kick-Ass 2.
 Assassin's Creed: Freedom Cry features machetes used by Adéwalé.
 Call of Duty: Black Ops II features a machete as an optional melee weapon in some missions.
 Dylan Morton from Dino Crisis 2 had a machete as a side weapon at the start of the game and enabled him to hack away at doors that were covered in heavy vegetation.
 Chris Redfield from Resident Evil 5 uses a machete as his default melee weapon.

References

External links 

 

 
American inventions
Hiking equipment
Blade weapons
Forestry tools
Camping equipment
Gardening tools